This is the 14th season of Primera B Leagues. The 2010 format would be as the same as every year:
the Champion and Runner-up of each Department would be promoted to the 2011 Bolivian Football Regional Leagues also known as Primera A.

Cochabamba

Santa Cruz

Tarija

La Paz

Football